Bermuda competed at the 2016 Summer Olympics in Rio de Janeiro, Brazil, from 5 to 21 August 2016. Since the nation's official debut in 1936, Bermudian athletes have appeared in every edition of the Summer Olympic Games, but did not attend the 1980 Summer Olympics in Moscow because of the nation's partial support for the US-led boycott.

The Bermuda Olympic Association sent a total of eight athletes, four per gender, to compete in five different sports at the Games, matching its roster size with London 2012. Two of them returned for their third Olympic appearance in Rio de Janeiro: triathlete Flora Duffy and long jumper Tyrone Smith, who finished twelfth in the final at the previous Games. The most successful and experienced member of the team, Smith was appointed by the committee to carry the Bermudian flag in the opening ceremony. Among the sports represented by the athletes, Bermuda marked its Olympic return in rowing for the first time since 1972. However, Bermuda failed to send an athlete in equestrian for the first time since 1976.

Bermuda, however, failed to collect its first Olympic medal, since the 1976 Summer Olympics in Montreal, where Clarence Hill won the bronze in men's heavyweight boxing. Unable to end her nation's 40-year drought on the podium, Duffy produced the best result for the Bermudans at the Games, finishing eighth in the women's triathlon.

Athletics (track and field)
 
Bermudan athletes have so far achieved qualifying standards in the following athletics events (up to a maximum of 3 athletes in each event):

Track & road events

Field events

Rowing

Bermuda has qualified one boat in the women's single sculls for the Games at the 2016 Latin American Continental Qualification Regatta in Valparaiso, Chile, signifying the nation's Olympic return to the sport for the first time since 1972.

Qualification Legend: FA=Final A (medal); FB=Final B (non-medal); FC=Final C (non-medal); FD=Final D (non-medal); FE=Final E (non-medal); FF=Final F (non-medal); SA/B=Semifinals A/B; SC/D=Semifinals C/D; SE/F=Semifinals E/F; QF=Quarterfinals; R=Repechage

Sailing
 
Bermuda has qualified a boat in the Laser Radial class by virtue of a top finish for North America at the 2016 ISAF World Cup regatta in Miami, Florida, United States. Another boat was also awarded to the Bermudian sailor competing in the Laser boat through a Tripartite Commission invitation.

M = Medal race; EL = Eliminated – did not advance into the medal race

Swimming

Bermuda has received a Universality invitation from FINA to send two swimmers (one male and one female) to the Olympics.

Triathlon
 
Bermuda has entered one triathlete to compete at the Games. Remarkably going to her third Olympics, world no. 6 seed Flora Duffy was ranked among the top 40 eligible triathletes in the women's event based on the ITU Olympic Qualification List as of 15 May 2016.

See also
Bermuda at the 2015 Pan American Games

References

External links 
 

Nations at the 2016 Summer Olympics
2016
Olymp